FC Dnistrovets Bilhorod-Dnistrovskyi is a Ukrainian amateur football club from Bilhorod-Dnistrovskyi. It was formerly known as Tyras-2500 Bilhorod-Dnistrovskyi. It plays in the Odessa Oblast Championship (season 2019–20).

League and cup history

{|class="wikitable"
|-bgcolor="#efefef"
! Season
! Div.
! Pos.
! Pl.
! W
! D
! L
! GS
! GA
! P
!Domestic Cup
!colspan=2|Europe
!Notes
|}

References

 
Football clubs in Odesa Oblast
Amateur football clubs in Ukraine
Bilhorod-Dnistrovskyi
Association football clubs established in 1930
1930 establishments in Ukraine